Sueño de amor may refer to:

 Sueño de amor (1993 TV series), a Mexican telenovela
 Sueño de amor (2016 TV series), a Mexican telenovela